Vladimir Nikolayevich Filipov (November 2, 1838 – May 12, 1903) was an Imperial Russian lieutenant general, brigade, division and corps commander. He took part in the suppression of the uprising in Poland and in the war against the Ottoman Empire. He died in what is now Ukraine.

Awards 
 Order of Saint Stanislaus (House of Romanov), 3rd class, 1863
 Order of Saint Anna, 3rd class, 1864
 Order of Saint Stanislaus (House of Romanov), 2nd class, 1869
 Order of Saint Anna, 2nd class, 1873
 Order of Saint George, 4th degree, 1877
 Gold Sword for Bravery, 1878
 Order of Saint Vladimir, 3rd class, 1878
 Order of Saint Stanislaus (House of Romanov), 1st class, 1887
 Order of Saint Anna, 1st class, 1890
 Order of Saint Vladimir, 2nd class, 1901

Works 
 A military review of the Tiflis governorate and zakatala district. — Spb., 1872.
 Military-topographical and strategic review of Northeast Asian provinces of Turkey. — Spb., 1874.
 Asian military review of Turkey. — Spb., 1881.
 Military review of the Thracian peninsula. — Spb., 1884.
 Strategic description of the Bosphorus. — Spb., 1886.
 Topographical overview of the Tiflis governorate and zakatala district. -Tiflis, 1897. (2 Ed. 1872 year books)

1838 births
1903 deaths
Russian people of the January Uprising
Russian military personnel of the Russo-Turkish War (1877–1878)
Russian military personnel of the Boxer Rebellion
Recipients of the Order of Saint Stanislaus (Russian), 3rd class
Recipients of the Order of St. Anna, 3rd class
Recipients of the Order of Saint Stanislaus (Russian), 2nd class
Recipients of the Order of St. Anna, 2nd class
Recipients of the Gold Sword for Bravery
Recipients of the Order of St. Vladimir, 3rd class
Recipients of the Order of Saint Stanislaus (Russian), 1st class
Recipients of the Order of St. Anna, 1st class
Recipients of the Order of St. Vladimir, 2nd class